"Baby Boy" is a song recorded by Danish Eurodance act and sisters Me & My, released in December 1995 as the second single from their eponymous album (1995). Co-written by the Georgi sisters, it enjoyed moderate success in many European countries, reaching number-one in both Denmark and Hungary. Additionally, it peaked at number three in Finland, number 10 in Belgium and number 30 in Austria. On the Eurochart Hot 100, the song reached number 60 in March 1996. Pan-European magazine Music & Media described it as "equally up-tempo and infectious" as their first single, "Dub-I-Dub". In 2007, the song was included on the act's best of album, The Ultimate Collection.

Music video
The accompanying music video for "Baby Boy" was, like "Dub-I-Dub", directed by Danish artist Peter Ravn. It features Me & My dressed like cats, rabbits and nuns. The video was later published on Warner Music Denmark's official YouTube channel in February 2009, and by January 2023, it had generated more than 2 million views.

Track listing
 12" single, Denmark
"Baby Boy" (Flex Club Mix) – 6:49
"Baby Boy" (Radio Version) – 3:23
"Baby Boy" (Dub Combo Version) – 5:06
"Baby Boy" (Rythmicity Version) – 9:28 

 CD maxi, Europe
"Baby Boy" (Radio Version) – 3:23
"Baby Boy" (Flex Club Mix) – 5:50
"Baby Boy" (Dub COmbo Version) – 5:23
"Baby Boy" (Rythmicity Version) – 9:28

 CD maxi, Japan
"Baby Boy" (Radio Version) – 3:24
"Baby Boy" (Flex Club Mix) – 5:49
"Baby Boy" (Dub Combo Version) – 5:23
"Baby Boy" (Rythmicity Version) – 9:28
"Dub-I-Dub" (DJ Beam's Radio Remix) – 3:49
"Dub-I-Dub" (88-Keys Cub Mix) – 5:42

Charts and certifications

Weekly charts

Certification

References

1995 singles
1995 songs
Me & My songs
EMI Records singles
Number-one singles in Denmark
Number-one singles in Hungary
English-language Danish songs